The South Pacific Regional Fisheries Management Organisation (SPRFMO) is an intergovernmental organization created by international treaty, the Convention on the Conservation and Management of High Seas Fishery Resources in the South Pacific Ocean signed in Auckland on .

The intent of the signatories was to commit "to ensuring the long-term conservation and sustainable use of fishery resources in the South Pacific Ocean and in so doing safeguarding the marine ecosystems in which the resources occur."

Secretariat
The secretariat of SPRFMO is based in Wellington, New Zealand. Currently the Executive Secretary is Mr Craig Loveridge

Members
The government members of the SPRFMO are:

References

Intergovernmental organizations established by treaty
Fisheries agencies
International organisations based in New Zealand
Pacific Ocean
Treaties of Australia
Treaties of Chile
Treaties of China
Treaties of the Cook Islands
Treaties of Cuba
Treaties of Ecuador
Treaties entered into by the European Union
Treaties extended to the Faroe Islands
Treaties of North Korea
Treaties of New Zealand
Treaties of Peru
Treaties of Russia
Treaties of Taiwan
Treaties of the United States
Treaties of Vanuatu
Treaties concluded in 2009
Treaties entered into force in 2012
Environmental treaties
Treaties establishing intergovernmental organizations
2009 in New Zealand